Ānanda Bhaṭṭa was a 16th or 17th century Bengali Shaivaite commentator on Vedanta.

He is the author of the Vallalacharita, supposedly written at the behest of  the Raja of Nabadvip, Buddhimanta Khan.

Editions:
Vedantakaumudi on the Vijnanabhairava, ed.  Mukunda Rama Sastri, 1918.

Vedanta